Kim Hyung-seo (born September 27, 1998), known professionally as Bibi (stylised in all caps), is a South Korean singer-songwriter. In 2017, she signed with Feel Ghood Music after Yoon Mi-rae discovered her self-produced songs on SoundCloud.

Early life
Kim Hyung-seo was born in Ulsan and spent her teenage years in Changwon. She felt awkward talking to people, so she began to write lyrics about not being able to say what she want to say when she was 15.

Career 
Bibi appeared as a contestant in SBS competition show The Fan, where she eventually finished in second place. She made her official debut with the single "Binu" on May 15, 2019.

In April 2021, she released her second extended play Life is a Bi.... In October, she released collaboration single "The Weekend" with 88rising. It later peaked at 29 on the Mediabase Top 40 chart, making Bibi the first Korean female soloist to do so. In December, she signed a global promotion deal with 88rising. In 2022, she released her debut studio album Lowlife Princess: Noir.

Artistry

Name 
Bibi was also known as "Nakedbibi" on SoundCloud. The name's meaning came from "baby" sounding like "bibi" when pronounced quickly, and that newborn babies don't wear any clothes and have a natural appearance that isn't affected by anything. Her current stage name is said to be one that defines her want to show her honest self.

Musical style 
Bibi pursues freewheeling and out-of-the-box music. Her music features various genres, including R&B, soul, hip hop, and ballad. Rather than focusing on dealing with beautiful things beautifully, it is a style of music that focuses on beautifully sublimating beautiful sorrows and pains that are alienated and hidden from the world. She gets inspiration from her experience and feelings.

Appearance 
Bibi is known for the two red dots under her eyes that was variously described as moles or dots. The dots are her makeup style that were inspired from her grandpa's roseola that was caused by his fevers, which he died from, and a tribute to her grandpa who was a role model to her.

Personal life
Bibi has a younger sister, Kim Na-kyoung, who debuted in the girl group TripleS through one of its sub-units Acid Angel from Asia on October 28, 2022.

Discography

Studio albums

Extended plays

Singles

As lead artist

As featuring artist

Collaborations

Soundtrack appearances

Filmography

Film

Reality shows

Web shows

Concert 
 Can You Come? (2022)

Awards and nominations

Notes

References

External links 
  (Feel Ghood Music)

1998 births
21st-century South Korean women singers
Living people
People from Ulsan
South Korean film actresses